Venavi (also Romanized as Venāvī and Vanāvī; also known as Vanāveh and Wināweh) is a village in Kuhsar Rural District, in the Central District of Shazand County, Markazi Province, Iran. At the 2006 census, its population was 123, in 24 families.

References 

Populated places in Shazand County